Cristian Vogel (born 1972) is an Chilean experimental electronic musician.

Biography
Vogel was born in Chile and moved to England in the early 1980s with his family, fleeing from the government of Augusto Pinochet. Vogel first began working with electronic compositions in the late 1980s with the Cabbage Head Collective (working with Si Begg, among others). He attended the University of Sussex and graduated with a degree in modern music there, suffusing his techno compositions with influences from musique concrete and other avant-garde styles.

In the early 1990s, Vogel began working with Dave Clarke, and issued several EPs on Clarke's Magnetic North Records label, the first of which was the underground success, Infra. After some collaborations with Russ Gabriel, Vogel released his debut full-length, Beginning to Understand, in 1994 on Mille Plateaux, and began releasing music regularly after this on Tresor Records. He also started two labels of his own, Mosquito and Quinine, on which he releases both his own music and other artists'.

In the early 2000s, Vogel moved to Barcelona, where he set up the Erutufon 5 studio. He currently lives there full time.

In recent years, he has started a number of other record labels: Rise Robots Rise (now defunct), Sleep Debt, and Station 55 (also the name of his studio). Whilst these record labels are primarily a vehicle to release his own work, they have also released records for other artists.

Alongside Jamie Lidell, he formed the group Super Collider, who released two albums, before Jamie Lidell saw fame with his Warp Records album Multiply. He currently sings and plays guitar in the band Night of the Brain, based in Barcelona.

Vogel has also been sought after as a remixer, having remixed artists such as Radiohead, Maximo Park, Chicks on Speed, and Fujiya & Miyagi.

Discography

Albums 
 1994 - Beginning to Understand (Mille Plateaux)
 1995 - Absolute Time (Tresor Records)
 1996 - Specific Momentific (Mille Plateaux)
 1996 - Body Mapping (Tresor Records)
 1997 - All Music has come to an End (Tresor Records)
 1999 - Busca Invisibles (Tresor Records)
 2000 - Rescate 137 (novamute)
 2000 - Sing Sweet Software (as Trurl and Klapaucious) (Supremat)
 2002 - Dungeon Master (Tresor Records)
 2005 - Station 55 (Novamute)
 2007 - Double Deux/Delicado (Station 55 Records)
 2007 - The Never Engine (Tresor Records)
 2010 - Black Swan (Choreographic score, 2009) (Sub Rosa)
 2012 - The Inertials (Shitkatapult)
 2014 - Polyphonic Beings (Shitkatapult)

EPs
 1994 - Infra EP (Magnetic North)
 1994 - Lambda EP (Magnetic North)
 1994 - Intersync EP (Force Inc)
 1994 - Narco Synthesis EP (Ferox)
 1995 - Conscious Arrays EP (Force Inc)
 1997 - Two fat Downloads 88 EP (Primevil)
 1999 - Boom Busine EP (Mosquito)
 2009 - Crust Cloud Chunks EP (Snork Enterprises)
 2009 - Endless Process EP (Artifexbcn Records)
 2010 - Time To Feed The Alien EP (Snork Enterprises)

Singles
 1994 - We equate Machines with Funkiness (Mosquito)
 1994 - Tales from the Heart (Force Inc)
 1995 - Defunkt #1 (Solid)
 1995 - Artists in Charge of Expert Systems (Mosquito)
 1996 - The Visit: Defunkt #2 (Solid)
 1996 - Demolish Serious Culture (Sativae)
 1998 - Defunkt Remixes (Solid)
 1998 - Syncopate to Generate (Sativae)
 1999 - General Arrepientase (Tresor)
 2000 - Whipaspank (Novamute)
 2001 - Me and My Shadow (Novamute)
 2005 - 1968. Holes (Novamute)
 2009 - Crust Cloud Chunks Remixes (Snork Enterprises)
 2012 - I like it - Sounds like Spain (Hyper Connection)

Compositions for Dance
2003 - "2-0-0-3" with Clive Jenkins and Franz Treichler 
2004 - "Delicado" / choreography  Gilles Jobin
2005 - "Steakhouse" / choreography  Gilles Jobin
2006 - "Double Deux" / choreography  Gilles Jobin
2008 - "Text to Speech" / choreography  Gilles Jobin
2009 - "Black Swan" / choreography Gilles Jobin

References

External links
NeverEngine Labs—official site.
Cristian Vogel discography at Discogs.

1972 births
Living people
Chilean electronic musicians
Alumni of the University of Sussex